Finnish hip hop or rap or (suomirap, rap) is a variant of hip hop music from Finland. The rapping (räppääminen) is mainly done in Finnish. Many rappers use Helsinki slang words; general slang and Finnish dialects are used too by some artists. Many early rappers used the English language. Some Finnish rap was already recorded in the early 1980s and some popular artists 1990s but it was not until the 2000s that it finally reached mainstream popularity.

The first recorded Finnish rap song was "I'm Young, Beautiful and Natural" in the English language which was made by an artist called General Njassa in 1983. Rap music in Finnish language made its first breakthrough in 1990 when groups Raptori and Pääkköset and artist Nikke T got their records to Finnish charts. Raptori in particular became a nationwide phenomenon. These artists had a style greatly different when compared to American rap music. Their music was highly influenced by the dance-pop of the 1980s and their approach to music was largely humoristic. Later Finnish rappers tend to despise this wave of the early 1990s. Niko Toiskallio (Nikke T) himself has later stated that he regrets his humoristic dance-influenced rap recordings and he claims that so-called humour-rap deprived the credibility of Finnish rap scene which did not recover until many years later in the late 1990s.

Notable artists 

Mainstream rap artists and crews

Eevil Stöö
Mikael Gabriel
JVG
Gettomasa
Cheek
Uniikki
Teflon Brothers
Mäkki
Elastinen
Spekti
Daco Junior
Ezkimo
Nikke Ankara 
Kapasiteettiyksikkö
Petri Nygård
 Redrama
Juju
Pyhimys
Kube
Heikki Kuula
 Cledos

Underground rap artists and crews

Amoc
Notkea Rotta
Steen1
OG Ikonen
Paleface
Raimo
Ruudolf
Ruger Hauer
Iso H
SMC Lähiörotat

References

External links
 Finnish hip hop portal based around the "Basso" magazine